Fernand Cornez (19 November 1907 in Paris – 7 December 1997 in Saint-Avertin) was a French professional road bicycle racer.

In 1933, he won a stage in the Tour de France and in the Giro d'Italia.

Major results

1933
Tour de France:
Winner stage 10
Giro d'Italia:
Winner stage 11
1934
GP de Cannes

External links 

Official Tour de France results for Fernand Cornez

French male cyclists
1907 births
1997 deaths
French Tour de France stage winners
French Giro d'Italia stage winners
Cyclists from Paris